Sir Samuel Walker Griffith,  (21 June 1845 – 9 August 1920) was an Australian judge and politician who served as the inaugural Chief Justice of Australia, in office from 1903 to 1919. He also served a term as Chief Justice of Queensland and two terms as Premier of Queensland, and played a key role in the drafting of the Australian Constitution.

Griffith was born in Wales, arriving in the Moreton Bay district of New South Wales (now the state of Queensland) at the age of eight. He attended the University of Sydney, and after further legal training was called to the bar in 1867. Griffith was elected to the Queensland Legislative Assembly in 1872. He served as Attorney-General from 1874 to 1878, and subsequently became the leader of the parliament's liberal faction. Griffith's terms as premier ran from 1883 to 1888 and from 1890 to 1893. He led the Australian delegation to the 1887 Colonial Conference and took a keen interest in external affairs, giving financial and administrative support to the newly annexed Territory of Papua and establishing the Queensland Maritime Defence Force. Domestically, he had a reputation as a radical and was initially seen as an ally of the labour movement; this changed after his government's intervention in the 1891 shearers' strike.

In 1893, Griffith retired from politics to head the Supreme Court of Queensland. He was frequently asked to assist in drafting legislation, and the Queensland criminal code – the first in Australia – was mostly his creation. Griffith was an ardent federationist, and with Andrew Inglis Clark wrote the draft constitution that was presented to the 1891 constitutional convention. Many of his contributions were preserved in the final constitution enacted in 1900. Griffith was involved in the drafting of the federal Judiciary Act 1903, which established the High Court of Australia, and was subsequently nominated by Alfred Deakin to become the inaugural Chief Justice. He presided over a number of constitutional cases, though some of his interpretations were rejected by later courts. He was also called on to advise governors-general during political instability. Griffith University and the Canberra suburb of Griffith are named in his honour.

Early life
Griffith was born in Merthyr Tydfil, Wales, the younger son of the Rev. Edward Griffith, a Congregational minister and his wife, Mary, second daughter of Peter Walker. His sister was the philanthropist Mary Harriett Griffith. Although of Welsh extraction, his forebears for at least three generations had lived in England. The family migrated to the Moreton Bay district of New South Wales (now the state of Queensland) when Samuel was eight. He was educated at schools in Ipswich, Sydney, Maitland and Brisbane (from 1860), towns where his father was a minister, then at the University of Sydney, where he graduated Bachelor of Arts in 1863, with first-class honours in classics, mathematics and natural science. During his course he was awarded the Cooper and Barker scholarships and other prizes.

In 1865, he gained the T. S. Mort Travelling Fellowship. Travelling to Europe, he spent some of his time in Italy, and became much attached to the Italian people and their literature. Many years after, he was to become the first Australian translator of Dante (The Inferno of Dante Alighieri in 1908).

On his return to Brisbane, Griffith studied law and was articled to Arthur Macalister, in one of whose ministries Griffith afterwards had his first portfolio. Griffith was called to the bar in 1867.

In 1870, Griffith returned to Sydney to complete a Master of Arts. In the same year, he married Julia Janet Thomson.

Political career
In 1872 Griffith was elected to the Legislative Assembly of Queensland, for East Moreton. Throughout his career he saw himself as a lawyer first and a politician second, and continued to appear at the Bar even when he was in office. Griffith took silk in 1876 as a Queen's Counsel. In Parliament he gained a reputation as a liberal reformer. He was Attorney-General, Minister for Education and Minister for Works, and became leader of the liberal faction (completely unrelated to the modern day Liberal Party in both existence and values) in 1879. His great enemy was the conservative leader Sir Thomas McIlwraith, whom he accused (correctly) of corruption.

Griffith had had a distinguished career in Queensland politics. Included in the legislation for which he was responsible were an offenders' probation act, and an act which codified the law relating to the duties and powers of justices of the peace. He also succeeded in passing an eight hours bill through the assembly which was, however, thrown out by the Queensland Legislative Council.

Griffith became Premier in November 1883 displacing McIlwraith. Griffith's election as Premier was assisted by auditor-general William Leworthy Goode Drew's report on the colony's loans having reached over £13 million. Griffith won the next election largely on his policy of preventing the importation of Kanaka labour from the islands. He passed an act for this purpose, but it was found that the danger of the destruction of the sugar industry was so great that the measure was never made operative. Recruiting was, however, placed under regulations and some of the worst abuses were swept away. Griffith took a special interest in British New Guinea, and was eventually responsible for the sending of Sir William MacGregor there in 1888.

Griffith held the office of premier until 1888, and was made a Knight Commander of the Order of St Michael and St George in 1886, before receiving an advancement to Knight Grand Cross of the Order of St Michael and St George in 1895. Griffith was regarded as a close ally of the labour movement. He introduced a bill to legalise trade unions, and declared that "the great problem of this age is not how to accumulate wealth but how to secure its more equitable distribution". In 1888 his government was defeated. In opposition he wrote radical articles for The Boomerang, William Lane's socialist newspaper.

But in 1890 Griffith suddenly betrayed his radical friends and became Premier again at the head of an unlikely alliance with McIlwraith, the so-called "Griffilwraith". The following year his government used the military to break the great shearers' strike, and he earned the nickname "Oily Sam".

Chief Justice of Queensland
On 13 March 1893, the Governor accepted Griffith's resignation from Vice-President and Member of the Executive Council and Chief Secretary and Attorney General and appointed Griffith to Chief Justice of the Supreme Court of Queensland where he served until 4 October 1903. In consequence he could not be a delegate to the Federal Australasian Convention of 1897-8 which produced, in near final form, the Constitution of Australia, but he acted as a behind-the-scenes advisor to Sir Robert Garran, secretary of the Drafting Committee, which followed the structure he had laid out in 1891. In 1899 he campaigned publicly for a 'yes' vote in the federation referendum in Queensland. In May 1900 he authored the very last amendment to the Constitution in the face of a standoff between the Colonial Secretary, Joseph Chamberlain and Edmund Barton over the right to appeal judgements of the High Court of Australia to the Judicial Committee of the Privy Council. Whereas Chamberlain wished the Constitution to give more space to such appeals, Barton, with Charles Kingston and Alfred Deakin, wanted them left restricted. Griffith privately damned the behaviour of Barton and Kingston as "monstrous",and formulated the compromise wording which appears in Section 74, and which appeased the involved parties.      

During his term as Chief Justice Griffith drafted Queensland's Criminal Code, a successful codification of the entire English criminal law, which was adopted in 1899, and later in Western Australia, Papua New Guinea, substantially in Tasmania, and other imperial territories including Nigeria. At May 2006 the Queensland Criminal Code remains largely unchanged.

Chief Justice of Australia

When the federal parliament passed the Judiciary Act 1903, which created the High Court of Australia, Griffith was the natural choice as the first Chief Justice. Griffith's appointment as one of the first three judges of the High Court was approved by the Governor-General on 5 October 1903. During his sixteen years on the bench Griffith sat on some 950 reported cases. In 1913 he visited England and sat on the Privy Council. Like Sir Edmund Barton, Griffith was several times consulted by Governors-General of Australia on the exercise of the reserve powers.

Griffith was the first of two justices of the High Court of Australia to have previously served in the Parliament of Queensland, along with Charles Powers. He was also one of five justices to have previously served on the Supreme Court of Queensland, along with William Webb, Harry Gibbs, Susan Kiefel and Patrick Keane. After 1910 Griffith's health declined, and in 1917 he suffered a stroke. He published a translation of Dante's Divina Commedia in 1912.

Royal Commissions
In January 1918, Griffith was appointed by Prime Minister Billy Hughes as head of a Royal Commission into the recruitment levels needed to maintain the Australian Imperial Force's fighting strength overseas. This came only a month after a second referendum on overseas conscription had returned a vote in the negative. Griffith was given such narrow terms of reference that his report took only a single week, and was effectively little more than a mathematical problem relating to the "existing size of the AIF, likely future losses of men, the numbers required to replace them, and so on". After the report was released, Hughes used it as vindication of his statements during the referendum debate.

Later writers have seen Griffith's involvement in the Royal Commission as inadvisable, as the findings were able to be used for political purposes and thus could be seen to have breached the separation of powers. It is the most recent occasion on which a sitting High Court judge has chaired a Royal Commission; Griffith had also authorised the first, which was conducted by George Rich in 1915 and also concerned military issues. However, in July 1918 he rejected another request from Hughes for a High Court judge to conduct a Royal Commission, on the grounds that it would "associate the High Court with political action".

Retirement and death

Griffith retired from the Court in 1919 and died at his home in Brisbane on 9 August 1920. He is buried in Toowong Cemetery, Brisbane, together with his wife, Julia, and their son, Llewellyn. Cemetery records indicate that their plot adjoins that of Griffith's dear friend Charles Mein (1841–1890) (barrister, politician and judge), the pair having met during their undergraduate studies at the University of Sydney.

Honours
Griffith is commemorated by the naming of Griffith University, with campuses throughout South East Queensland, the suburb of Griffith in Canberra, the federal electoral division of Griffith, Sir Samuel Griffith Drive on Mount Coot-tha in Brisbane, and the S.W. Griffith building of Brisbane Grammar School, which was the former Mathematics building and is now part of the Harlin House boarding precinct. The Samuel Griffith Society is a conservative organisation dedicated to defending what it sees as the principles of the Constitution – particularly, the principle of states' rights. His portrait, by Richard Godfrey Rivers, hangs in the Brisbane Supreme Court. Griffith was appointed a vice-president of the Royal Colonial Institute in 1909 and an honorary fellow of the British Academy in 1916.

In July 2016 Griffith was inducted in to the City of Maitland Hall of Fame.

Although demolished in 1963, his home Merthyr, named after his birthplace, gives its name to the neighbourhood of Merthyr in New Farm. Griffith Street and Merthyr Street in New Farm are also named after the man and his house.

See also
 List of Judges of the High Court of Australia
 List of Judges of the Supreme Court of Queensland

Notes

Further reading
 
 Joyce, Roger B: Samuel Walker Griffith, St Lucia (University of Queensland Press), 1984.
 Joyce R.B. & Murphy, D.J.(Ed.): Queensland Political Portraits, St Lucia (University of Queensland Press), 1978.

External links

 Queensland Criminal Code
 The Australian Constitution
 Griffith University, Brisbane
 Samuel Griffith Society
Griffith, Samuel Walker — Brisbane City Council Grave Location Search

People from Merthyr Tydfil
Premiers of Queensland
Chief Justices of Queensland
1845 births
1920 deaths
Australian federationists
Welsh Congregationalists
Australian Knights Grand Cross of the Order of St Michael and St George
Members of the Queensland Legislative Assembly
Chief justices of Australia
Justices of the High Court of Australia
Burials at Toowong Cemetery
Australian King's Counsel
Treasurers of Queensland
Attorneys-General of Queensland
Australian members of the Privy Council of the United Kingdom
Colony of Queensland judges
Judges of the Supreme Court of Queensland
Colony of Queensland people
Welsh emigrants to colonial Australia
19th-century Australian judges
20th-century Australian judges
Honorary Fellows of the British Academy
Translators of Dante Alighieri